The 4th Parliament of Upper Canada was opened 1 February 1805.  Elections in Upper Canada had been held in May 1804.  All sessions were held at Parliament Buildings of Upper Canada in York, Upper Canada.  This parliament was dissolved 21 May 1808.

This House of Assembly of the 4th Parliament of Upper Canada had four sessions 1 February 1805 to 16 March 1808:

See also
Legislative Council of Upper Canada
Executive Council of Upper Canada
Legislative Assembly of Upper Canada
Lieutenant Governors of Upper Canada, 1791–1841
Historical federal electoral districts of Canada
List of Ontario provincial electoral districts

References

Further reading 
Handbook of Upper Canadian Chronology, Frederick H. Armstrong, Toronto : Dundurn Press, 1985. 

04
1805 establishments in Upper Canada
1808 disestablishments in Upper Canada